The 2003 Scott Tournament of Hearts was held at the Kitchener Memorial Auditorium in Kitchener, Ontario from February 15 to 23. The Colleen Jones rink returned as Team Canada, going on to win their third straight Hearts, then representing Canada at the 2003 Ford World Curling Championship where they won silver.

Teams

Round-robin standings

Results
All times local (Eastern Time Zone, ET)

Draw 1
February 15, 2:30 PM ET

Draw 2
February 15, 7:30 PM ET

Draw 3
February 16, 9:30 AM ET

Draw 4
February 16, 2:30 PM ET

Draw 5
February 16, 7:30 PM ET

Draw 6
February 17, 9:30 AM ET

Draw 7
February 17, 2:30 PM ET

Draw 8
February 17, 7:30 PM ET

Draw 9
February 18, 9:30 AM ET

Draw 10
February 18, 2:30 PM ET

Draw 11
February 18, 7:30 PM ET

Draw 12
February 19, 9:30 AM ET

Draw 13
February 19, 2:30 PM ET

Draw 14
February 19, 7:30 PM ET

Draw 15
February 20, 9:30 AM ET

Draw 16
February 20, 2:30 PM ET

Draw 17
February 20, 7:30 PM ET

Playoffs

3 vs. 4
February 21, 2:30 PM ET

1 vs. 2
February 21, 7:30 PM ET

Semi-final
February 22, 7:30 PM ET

Final
February 23, 2:00 PM ET

References

Scotties Tournament of Hearts
Scott Tournament of Hearts
Sport in Kitchener, Ontario
Curling in Ontario
2003 in Ontario
2003 in women's curling